Norman Earil Hutchins (born September 27, 1962) is an American gospel musician. He started his solo music career, in 1992, with the release of, Norman Hutchins, that was released by Sparrow Records. He has released ten albums, over the course of 21 years, with Sparrow Records, JDI Records, and IR Records. Seven albums have charted on the Billboard magazine Gospel Albums chart.

Early life
Hutchins was born September 27, 1962, in Delaware, as Norman Earil Hutchins. He started preaching at the age of 8, while becoming ordained at the age of 12 by Bishop Foreman of Laurel, Delaware, and this allowed him to support his family, which his mother had 11 children that she had to raise. The preaching earned him $100 per evening. He went with his wife, at the age of 19, to Delaware, Pennsylvania, and became the preacher of Hope Church of God in Christ. He would eventually settle in Los Angeles, but would have to take meager jobs, until finally God lead him to West Angeles COGIC to be their music minister. Later on, he felt the call over him to move back to Delaware and start Frontline Ministries. He holds, a Master's Degree in Biblical Counseling and a Doctorate in Church Administration.

Personal life
He married his first wife Michelle at the age of 19. They had three children. Years after their divorce, he married his current wife, Karen. They together started Frontline Ministries, based out of Dover, Delaware. He has battled diabetes, which caused him to lose some of his vision, and go temporarily blind. This caused his kidneys to fail, and his wife was the perfect match, for her husband that she donated her kidney to him.

Music career
His music career started in 1992, with the release of Norman Hutchins by Sparrow Records, and they would also release 1993's, Don't Stop Praying. Yet, these both failed to chart and were the only two releases with the label. He caught success, when he joined JDI Records in 1999, and they released his third album, Nobody But You, and this was his Billboard magazine chart debut release on the Gospel Albums chart. He subsequent albums with the label, saw success on that same chart, and those were, Battlefield in 1999, Emmanuel in 2001; however, one album failed to chart, Battlefield: The Sermon released in 2002. He would then sign to IR Records, for the releases of  Spontaneous Praise, Vol. 1 in 2008, 2009's God Is Faithful, If You Didn't Know...Now You Know in 2011, and 2013's Hosanna, which all of them charted on the Gospel Albums chart. He has received eight Dove Award nominations and eight Stellar Award nominations, along with Grammy Awards nominations.

Discography

References

External links
 Official website

1962 births
Living people
African-American songwriters
African-American Christians
Musicians from Delaware
Songwriters from Delaware
People from Dover, Delaware
21st-century African-American people
20th-century African-American people